Attached Support Processor (ASP) was an implementation of loosely coupled multiprocessing for IBM's OS/360 operating system. IBM later changed the name to Asymmetrical multiProcessor but retained the acronym ASP.

ASP evolved from the design of the 7094/7044 direct coupled system, using data channel to data channel communication. By attaching an IBM 7044 as a peripheral processor throughput of the 7094 was more than doubled.

ASP was introduced in March 1967, and initially allowed connection of two System/360 computers via a channel-to-channel adapter (CTCA). 

As initially defined an ASP system typically consisted of a large System/360 computer, a Model 50, 65, or 75 running OS/360, called the main processor, and a smaller System/360, Model 40 or larger, called the support processor, running the ASP supervisor as a single task under OS/360 PCP (Primary Control Program). The support processor performed functions such as printing, card reading and punching, freeing the main processor to run the application workload. It queued jobs, roughly 30 in the basic configuration, and released them to the main processor in priority order, and also did pre-execution setup of removable input/output devices such as disks and tapes on the main processor.

The main processor was configured identically to a "stand-alone processor operating under OS/360, except that the
channel-to-channel adapter replaces the normal system input
and output devices."  The support processor was a minimum of a Model 40 G (G indicates memory size of 128KB) with two selector channels, a 1052 console typewriter, a 2540 card read/punch, a 1403 printer, and three 2311 disk drives. It was recommended that the support processor have access to one 2400-series tape drive for support. 

The OS version on the main processor was modified to be able to overlay itself with the 7090/94 emulator program when an emulator job was to be run, and the emulator program would similarly overlay itself with OS/360 when done, to process emulated 709x jobs intermixed with standard 360 jobs. This later became unnecessary with the introduction of integrated emulation programs on the Model 85 and System/370

Later IBM allowed a single support processor to control multiple main processors and added support for Local ASP (LASP), in which the same processor serves as both a local and a main. These capabilities are standard in the final ASP version, version 3, as is support for OS/VS2 (SVS).

With the introduction of MVS for System/370 IBM rewrote and renamed ASP as Job Entry Subsystem 3 (JES3) and it is still in use as of 2015.

See also
HASP
Job Entry Subsystem 2/3
Spooling

Notes

References

IBM software
Operating system technology
Job scheduling